Francisco Javier Vence Gómez (born 11 April 1992) is a Panamanian footballer who plays as a left back for the Panama national team.

Club career
Vence was born in Panama City, and played for local sides Chorrillo, Atlético Nacional and CAI La Chorrera. On 8 February 2021, he moved abroad and joined Venezuelan Primera División club Deportivo Lara, but left the club after two months and without debuting.

International career
Vence represented Panama at under-20 level before making his full international debut on 28 January 2021, starting in a 0–0 friendly home draw against Serbia.

References

External links
 
 

1992 births
Living people
Sportspeople from Panama City
Panamanian footballers
Association football defenders
Unión Deportivo Universitario players
Asociación Civil Deportivo Lara players
Panama international footballers
Panamanian expatriate footballers
Panamanian expatriate sportspeople in Venezuela
Expatriate footballers in Venezuela